Uppermill is a village in the civil parish of Saddleworth in the Metropolitan Borough of Oldham, in Greater Manchester, England. Uppermill forms a continuous urban area with the neighbouring village of Dobcross—the two have a combined population of 7,500.

History
Although there is evidence of Roman activity in the area, the history of Uppermill is dominated by the expansion of wool and cotton spinning into the area during the Industrial Revolution, with the construction of several mills.

Demography

The villages of Uppermill and Dobcross were treated as a single entity by the Office for National Statistics in the 2001 United Kingdom Census. As such, there are no demographic statistics for the village on its own. The statistics given here are for the combined population of Uppermill and Dobcross, which are about half a mile apart.

At the 2001 census, the area had a population of 7,475. Of those over 16 years old, 22.5% were single (never married), 49.6% married, and 7.8% divorced. The 3,225 households in the area included 27.7% one-person, 43.2% married couples living together, 8.1% were co-habiting couples, and 6.9% single parents with their children. Of those aged 16–74, 21.1% had no academic qualifications, significantly below the averages of Oldham (37.7%) and England (28.9%).

At the 2001 UK census, 79.6% of residents in the area reported themselves as being Christian, 0.3% Muslim, 0.3% Hindu, 0.2% Buddhist and 0.2% Jewish. The census recorded 13.3% as having no religion, 0.2% had an alternative religion and 6.0% did not state their religion.

Geography

References

External links

Uppermill brass band
Uppermill Football club

Villages in Greater Manchester
Towns and villages of the Peak District
Geography of the Metropolitan Borough of Oldham
Saddleworth